Victoria Annie Monks (1 November 1884 – 26 January 1927) was a British music hall singer of the early 20th century.  During the Edwardian and First World War eras she performed and recorded popular songs such as "Take Me Back to London Town" and "Won't You Come Home Bill Bailey".

Life and career
Monks was born in Blackpool, Lancashire on 1 November 1884, the daughter of Charles Monks. She was educated in both England and Belgium. In 1899 she made her first stage appearance as "Little Victoria"; her first appearance in London was at the Oxford Music Hall on 9 March 1903. She went on to appear in all the leading Music Halls, both in London and the provinces.  She married the American songwriter and Music Hall manager Karl F. Hooper and by 1911, they were living in Lambeth, London with a daughter. In 1915 she was prevented from working following an accident which involved a stage door at one of the Moss Empires theatres; she became bankrupt shortly afterwards.

She died in London in 1927 and is buried in St. Mary's Roman Catholic Cemetery near Harlesden, London. Her great-granddaughter Chloe Hooper was born in Basingstoke and grew up in Silchester – she is both an international vocalist and Tribute Act today.

Songs and recordings

Monks performed and recorded a number of popular songs of her day. A 
list of some of her recordings is given below with lyricists and recording dates where known. Monks recorded for HMV and their Zonophone sister label between 1906 and 1913. and also for Pathe, Jumbo Fonotipia, Edison and Homophone.
 "Ain't the Old Place Good Enough for You", (Clarence Wainwright Murphy & D. Lipton)
 "Ain't Yer Gwine to Say 'How Do'?". Recorded 1906
 "Buy Me a Home in London"
 "Give My Regards to Leicester Square", (William Hargreaves). Recorded 1906
 "Take Me Back to London Town", (Arthur Trevelyan & Harry Von Tilzer). 
 "Ain't I No Use, Mr Jackson?", (Clarence Wainwright Murphy & D. Lipton). Recorded 1906
 "If You Want to Have a Row, Wait Till the Sun Shines", (William Hargreaves). Recorded 1906
 "Won't You Come Home Bill Bailey?", (Hughie Cannon) never recorded
 "Brown Eyes and Blue Eyes" not recorded
 "Ise Gwine Back to Jacksonville". Recorded 1906
 "Love Song". Recorded 1906
 "Open the Door". Recorded 1907
 "Hello Old Man". Recorded 1907
 "Sweet Saturday Night", (Percy Ford & J.B.Mullen). Recorded 1907
 "I'm Leaving Home". Recorded 1907
 "Moving Day", (Andrew B. Sterling & Harry Von Tilzer). Recorded 1908
 "Hello Miss London: A Bunch of Roses", (Tom Mellor). Recorded 1913
 "The Vickey Glide", (Tom Mellor). Recorded 1913

References and notes

External links
 Link to Chloe Hooper's website

1884 births
1927 deaths
People from Blackpool
Music hall performers
British women singers
Burials at St Mary's Catholic Cemetery, Kensal Green
20th-century English singers
20th-century English women singers